Dorothy Irene Macfarlane (2 December 1931 – 2002) was an English cricketer who played as a right-arm pace bowler. She appeared in seven Test matches for England between 1957 and 1963. She played domestic cricket for Northumberland.

References

External links
 
 

1931 births
2002 deaths
Cricketers from Newcastle upon Tyne
England women Test cricketers
Northumberland women cricketers